Suleyman Rustam (12 March 1906 – 10 June 1989) was poet of Soviet Azerbaijan, playwright and a public figure. He was the poet of the Azerbaijan SSR (1960), laureate of the Stalin State Prize of the second degree (1950), Hero of Socialist Labour (1976) and a member of the Communist Party of the Soviet Union from 1940.

Biography
Suleyman Rustam was born on March 12, 1906, in Novxanı village in family of a blacksmith.

He studied at Russo-Tatar school until revolution. Suleyman Rustam wrote that, Suleyman Sani Akhundov, who was the headmaster and pedagogue at the school evoked his interest to literature and such famous pedagogues as M.Vezirov, R.Tahirov and A.Israfilbeyli strengthened this interest. After he entered Baku Electric Technical School and then to the eastern faculty of Baku State University where his classmates were Jafar Jabbarly, A.Badalbeyli, V.Khuluflu and was taught by such pedagogue as the eminent writer Abdurrahim bey Hagverdiyev.

In 1929, Suleyman Rustam continued his education at the faculty of literature and arts of Moscow State University. From 1937, he worked as a chairman of Azerbaijan State Academic Drama Theatre named after M.Azizbekov. He was the deputy of all convocations of the Soviet Parliament of Azerbaijan and from 1971 till 1989 he was the chairman of Supreme Soviet of the Azerbaijan SSR. Suleyman Rustam was not only the poet, he also was a translator and a literary man. He translated works of I.A.Krylov, A.S.Griboyedov, A.S.Pushkin, M.Y.Lermontov, N.A.Nekrasov and others into his native language. Suleyman Rustam's works were translated into many languages of the world and also into Russian.

Rustam worked as a chief editor of "Edebiyyat qazeti" ("Literature newspaper"). He was the laureate of many prestigious premiums of Azerbaijan and the USSR.

Suleyman Rustam died on June 10, 1989, and was buried in the Alley of Honor in Baku.

Memory

 In 2006, a stamp of Azerbaijan dedicated to Suleyman Rustam was released.
 A memorial plate was fixed in his honor in Baku.

Creativity
His first collection of poems, "From sadness to happiness", written in 1927, was dedicated to Komsomol, civil war, courage of soldiers struggling for the Soviet power, as other poems of the poet, written in the 1920s ("Partisan Ali", "Armless hero").

The main theme of his works, created in 1930s ("Romanticism of a night"), was the creation of romanticism of a collective work, attracting spiritual enrichment of people. "A good comrade" poem was dedicated to labor feats of cotton growers in Mugham steppes. In 1939-1940s, S.Rustam wrote "Qachaq Nebi" novel. The poet used folk proverbs about Qachaq Nebi, expanded and deepened them socially and historically, gave a social perception to the novel. Main heroes of the novel are Qachaq Nebi - a famous leader of the national movement of the 19th century and Hejer - his brave wife and fellow fighter.

Nebi, the son of a poor peasant, working as a farm laborer at bey, didn't bear cruelty and rudeness of his master and run to mountains and became "qachaq" (fugitive). He assembled dissatisfied peasants around him, vengeance for outraged people, took away money and commodities from the rich and gave them to the poor. He was supported by the whole neighborhood and courageously opposed tsar officers and gendarme and kept day-laborers in awe for a long time.  And "noble brigand" Nebi's revolt was also collapsed as every spontaneous peasant struggle.

Patriotic poems ("A day will come", "To the sons of Azerbaijan", "Old man's answer") written during the Great Patriotic War were dedicated to bravery and selflessness of the Soviet people, their unshakeable belief and victory over the enemy. Suleyman Rustam's "Mother and a postman" poem had a great fame (1942). Mother waiting for news from his front-line soldier son for four months says the postman: "If there is not any letter for me…don't come here again!" Disappointed postman goes away, but he is not offended, he is distressed by sufferings of the old mother. In her turn mother also regrets for her action. Finally, the postman brings a long-awaited letter and the postman and the whole neighborhood rejoices at the mother's happiness. This poem, written with a great emotional strength, deeply excites a reader and evokes his heartwarming feelings.

During the postwar times the poet wrote a collection of poems called "Two shores", dedicated to hard life of Azerbaijani paupers in Iran and postwar flourishing of the Soviet Azerbaijan. Image of hero Qafur Mammadov, who shielded his commander from enemies by his chest, was created in "Qafur's heart" poem.

Works

 "From sadness to happiness" (1927)
 "Armless hero" (1928)
 "A good comrade" (1933)
 "Star" (1934)
 "Romanticism of a night" (1940)
 "Mother's heart" (1942)
 "Cranes" (1942)
 "A day will come" (1943)
 "Mother and a postman" (1942)
 "Two shores" (1949)
 "Gafur's heart" (1950)
 "Songs of life" (1958)
 "Word about a Russian brother" (1960)
 "On sunny shores" (1963)
 "Spring reflections" (1964)
 "A little bit about love" (1966)

Awards and premiums

 Stalin Order of the second degree (1950) – for collection of poems "Two shores" (1949)
 Hero of Socialist Labour (1976)
 Three Lenin Orders
 Two Orders of the Red Banner of Labor
 The Order of Friendship of Peoples
 People's Poet of the Azerbaijan SSR (1960)
 Honored Art Worker of the Azerbaijan SSR (1943)
 The State Premium of the Azerbaijan SSR

References

1906 births
1989 deaths
People from Absheron District
20th-century Azerbaijani poets
Soviet poets
Soviet male writers
20th-century male writers
Soviet translators
Azerbaijani translators
Stalin Prize winners
Recipients of the Order of Lenin
Azerbaijani writers
Translators to Azerbaijani
Socialist realism writers
Members of the Supreme Soviet of the Azerbaijan Soviet Socialist Republic
Communist Party of the Soviet Union members
Soviet Azerbaijani people
Moscow State University alumni
20th-century translators
Azerbaijani male poets
Honored Art Workers of the Azerbaijan SSR